Mr. Reliable is a 1996 film directed by Nadia Tass. It stars Colin Friels and Jacqueline McKenzie.

Plot
It tells the true story of Wally Mellish, an ex-convict in 1960s Australia. Just released from prison, all he wants to do is live a quiet life with his girlfriend Beryl. A misunderstanding, quickly gets out of control, when two police officers pay him a visit, resulting in Wally, Beryl and her child being trapped in their house.  Surrounded by armed police, the community is under the impression that Wally is holding everyone hostage. Events quickly spiral into a media circus as, through the siege, Wally - inadvertently - manages to become a symbol for the anti-war movement.

Cast
Colin Friels as Wally Mellish
Jacqueline McKenzie as Beryl Muddle
 Ken Radley as Mr. Morgan
 Graham Rouse as Fred
Jonathan Hardy as Reverend McIntyre
 Elaine Cusick as Mrs. McIntyre
Frank Gallacher as Ferguson
Paul Sonkkila as Norm Allan
Susie Porter as Fay
Gerry Skilton as Reggie Muddle

Production
Terry Hayes was attached to produce the film. He showed a script to Nadia Tass, who liked the story and the characters but wanted it rewritten. Hayes made the changes and Tass came on board to direct. Also released as My Entire Life.

Release
The film opened in the UK on 22 November 1996. It opened in Australia on 30 January 1997 on 64 screens and grossed $139,939 in its opening week, placing 14th at the Australian box office. It went on to gross $266,329 in Australia.

References

External links

Mr Reliable at Oz Movies

1996 films
Australian comedy films
Films directed by Nadia Tass
Films set in 1968
Films set in Australia
1990s English-language films
1990s Australian films